Basiria is a genus of nematodes.

References 

Secernentea genera
Tylenchida